Temnora natalis is a moth of the family Sphingidae. It is known from bush and savanna from South Africa to Zimbabwe, Zambia and Tanzania.

The length of the forewings is 22–24 mm. It is immediately distinguishable from all other Temnora species by the pale grey forewing upperside crossed by a pattern of dark brown transverse lines and with a characteristic pair of black triangular marginal spots. The forewing outer margin is crenulated.

References

Temnora
Lepidoptera of South Africa
Lepidoptera of Tanzania
Lepidoptera of Zambia
Lepidoptera of Zimbabwe
Moths of Sub-Saharan Africa
Moths described in 1856